The Libertarian Party of New York (LPNY) (also known as the Free Libertarian Party of New York), is the affiliate of the Libertarian Party in the U.S. state of New York. Due to changes in New York State election law in 2020, the Libertarian Party lost its ballot status.
It is the recognized affiliate of the national Libertarian Party.

The Libertarian Party of New York is dedicated to the principle that free people have the right to live the way they please, except to initiate force, the threat of force, or fraud, against other persons or their property.

History
The Libertarian Party was founded in 1971 on the libertarian principle: that people should be free to do whatever they wish, except to initiate force, the threat of force, or fraud against others or their property.  The principle does not preclude retaliatory force, as in the redress of wrongs through courts, and as in the traditional common law of self-defense. National Libertarian Party members, including the New York members, have paid $25 per year, and have as a condition of membership signified: "I certify that I do not believe in or advocate the initiation of force as a means of achieving political or social goals."

The Libertarian Party of New York was founded as an unregistered political party in 1970 by Paul and Michael Gilson who became its first people in public office the next year on election to a zoning board in Upstate New York. It helped drive the creation of a national party, and was re-organized in 1972 by a group now centered around Ed Clark, later the Libertarian Party presidential candidate. Its name was changed to the "Free Libertarian Party" when the New York Board of Elections ruled that the name Libertarian Party would confuse voters with the Liberal Party of New York. However, the Board of Elections eventually allowed the name "Libertarian Party" to be used. The Statue of Liberty is their ballot symbol, and they now appear on the ballot as the Libertarian Party.

Since 1974, the Libertarian Party of New York has had a candidate for Governor of New York on the ballot every four years except for 1986, the only party in New York State without official ballot status up to that point to do so. Several other minor parties in New York have achieved ballot status through electoral fusion, endorsing the candidate of a major party. The Libertarian Party of New York declined to achieve ballot status by this means, although Republican William Weld flirted with the LPNY gubernatorial nomination in 2006.

In 2018, Larry Sharpe, the Libertarian Party nominee for governor that year, finished with over 90,000 votes, the most in the state party's history for a gubernatorial candidate. By surpassing 50,000 votes, the Libertarian Party had achieved qualified party status, and ballot access, for the first time in its history. The party's membership jumped 25 percent after the qualification. However, the Libertarian Party lost its ballot status line in 2020 due to a change in New York State election law that is still under litigation.

Ballot access
After it first received write-in votes in 1972 for presidential candidate John Hospers and vice presidential candidate Tonie Nathan (The first female candidate for Vice President to receive an electoral vote), the LPNY has obtained at least 15,000 petition signatures
and placed statewide candidates on the ballot in every statewide election between 1974 and 2016, except 1986. These signatures were, by law, collected in a six-week period in mid-July to August (except in 1994, see Schulz v. Williams, 44 F.3d 48 (2d Cir. 1994)).

In the gubernatorial elections, Libertarian candidates included a full slate of the possible statewide candidates: Governor, Lieutenant Governor, Attorney General, Comptroller, and, when one is up for election: Senator. In the Presidential races, candidates included the full number of Electors for President and Vice President, and when one is up for election, Senator. This regular achievement of statewide ballot status by a full slate of candidates for 42 years indicates substantial support in New York State. Under the change in New York State election law, the Libertarian Party lost its status as one of the Qualified New York political parties.
Nationally, the Libertarian Party has 208,456 voters registered by the
respective state boards of election.

Leadership
The officers of the Libertarian Party of New York are elected annually. In 2018, the party become a ballot-recognized party, and a political entity was created that is recognized under election law. Therefore, the party is current going through a transition as it works to restructure. The officers of both entities are listed.

Past leadership

Listed local affiliates
The Libertarian Party of New York contains local county affiliates, each of which is administered by its own local Libertarian Party. County officers are elected in accordance with their rules.

Manhattan Libertarian Party
The Manhattan Libertarian Party (MLP) is a chapter of the Libertarian Party of New York established in 2000.

The Manhattan LP was the host chapter of the 2012 Libertarian Party of New York convention, held January 21, 2012. The convention was attended by several candidates seeking the national Libertarian Party's presidential nomination, including former New Mexico governor Gary Johnson and New York attorney Carl E. Person.

Candidates endorsed in the 2008 election endorsed by MLP
 Bob Barr for President of the United States
 Isaiah Matos for US Congress, New York's 14th congressional district
 Susan Overeem for US Congress, New York's 13th congressional district
 Bill Buran for New York State Assembly  District 72
 Nic Leobold for New York State Assembly District 66

Sam Sloan and the Manhattan madam Kristin M. Davis both sought the Libertarian Party nomination for Governor of New York State. Andrew Clunn sought to be nominated for Lieutenant Governor, Carl Person sought the nomination for Attorney General. John Clifton sought the nomination for US Senate, and Michel Faulkner sought the nomination for US Congress from the 15th Congressional District previously held by Charles Rangel.

Libertarian Party of Queens County 
The Libertarian Party of Queens County, formerly known as the "Queens Libertarian Party" led by Tom Stevens (politician), is the local affiliate of the LPNY for the Queens county-borough in the City of New York. The chapter was known for whipping up candidates for public office until 2010 when Blay Tarnoff hijacked the party and passed a surprise motion to decertify the chapter.

In December 2016, the LPNY State Committee voted to de-charter the chapter. Shortly thereafter, a small group of former Democrats and two former Republicans chartered the chapter under a new name. The "Libertarian Party of Queens County", or LPQC for short, was chaired by Elliot Axelman for its first 8 months. Axelman is a radio host, certified Paramedic and former Lieutenant for Whitestone Volunteer Ambulance Corps. In October 2017, Axelman resigned following a move to New Hampshire. His Vice Chair, Christopher Fuentes-Padilla, took over until November 19, 2017.

Accolades 
The Queens Chapter is the first chapter in the history of the LPNY to elect a Chair under the age of 24. Christopher Fuentes-Padilla, the former Vice Chair, was sworn in as Chairman at age 20 on November 20, 2017.

Padilla is also the first Hispanic to hold the Office in Queens and the first Puerto Rican male to hold office in the LPNY.

Suffolk County Libertarian Party
The Suffolk County Libertarian Party (formerly "SCLO") is a chapter of the Libertarian Party of New York established in 1974.

Vote totals for Libertarian candidates in New York

State elections

Governor

Attorney General

Comptroller

Federal elections

U.S. Senate

U.S. President

Current officeholders
As of September 19, 2020:
 Debra Altman – New York City Education Council, District 75
 Michael Becallo – Cicero Town Councilor
 Nick Grasso – Elmira City Council, District 1
 Mark Grozio – Niagara County Legislator, District 3
 Ryan Sanders – Sherman Village Board
 Michael Korchak – Broome County District Attorney
 Brandon Lyon – Johnstown Water Board
 Michael Paestella – Minetto Town Council
 Jame VanDewalker – Allen Town Clerk

References

Notes

External links 
 Bob Schulz's fight for more fair ballot access, November 1994 LP Press Release
 Ballot access in New York State, (written around 1995) by William Kone
 National Libertarian Party website
 Libertarian Party of NY website
 Libertarian Party of Manhattan website
 Nassau County Libertarian Party
 Libertarian Club of New York (independent organization, not formally affiliated with any political party)

Political parties in New York (state)
New York

de:Libertarian Party
fr:Parti libertarien (États-Unis)
ja:アメリカ・リバタリアン党
pl:Partia Libertariańska (USA)
sv:Libertarian Party
zh:美国自由党